Rosanna Catherine Payne (née Stark) (March 19, 1884 – October 31, 1954) was an American businesswomen, teacher, and politician.

Born in Harris, Minnesota, Payne went to the Harris public schools and to Caton Business College. She was involved with the general mercantile and real estate/loan businesses in Ball Club, Minnesota. Harris also owned a farm and was a teacher. Harris served as postmistress for Ball Club, Minnesota. From 1927 to 1932, Payne served in the Minnesota House of Representatives and was a Democrat. Payne died at her home in Minneapolis, Minnesota.

Notes

1884 births
1954 deaths
People from Harris, Minnesota
People from Itasca County, Minnesota
Businesspeople from Minnesota
Educators from Minnesota
20th-century American women educators
20th-century American educators
Farmers from Minnesota
Women state legislators in Minnesota
Democratic Party members of the Minnesota House of Representatives
Minnesota postmasters
20th-century American women politicians
20th-century American politicians
20th-century American businesspeople
Schoolteachers from Minnesota